Adam Paul Scott (born April 3, 1973) is an American actor, comedian, and producer. He is known for his role as Ben Wyatt in the NBC sitcom Parks and Recreation for which he was twice nominated for the Critics' Choice Television Award for Best Actor in a Comedy Series. He has also appeared as Derek Huff in the film Step Brothers, Johnny Meyer in The Aviator, Henry Pollard in the Starz sitcom Party Down, Ed Mackenzie in the HBO series Big Little Lies, and Trevor in the NBC series The Good Place. In 2022, he began starring in the Apple TV+ psychological drama series Severance, for which he received numerous award nominations, including for  Primetime Emmy Award for Outstanding Lead Actor in a Drama Series, as well as best actor nominations from the Screen Actor's Guild, Golden Globes, Critic's Choice, and more.

Early life 
Scott was born in Santa Cruz, California, to Anne ( Quartararo) and Simon Dougald Scott, both of whom are retired teachers. His parents divorced when he was a child. His father is of Scottish descent, while his mother is of half Italian (Sicilian) and half Irish descent. He has two older siblings, Shannon and David. He graduated from Harbor High School and the American Academy of Dramatic Arts in Los Angeles, California.

Career

Film 

Scott has appeared in several feature films, including Hellraiser: Bloodline (1996), Star Trek: First Contact (1996), The Lesser Evil (1998), High Crimes (2002), The Aviator (2004), Torque (2004), Monster-in-Law (2005), Knocked Up (2007), Step Brothers (2008), The Vicious Kind (2009), Piranha 3D (2010), Friends with Kids (2012), The Secret Life of Walter Mitty (2013) and Krampus (2015).

Scott attributes his pivot from dramatic to comedic roles to landing the part of Derek Huff in Step Brothers (2008), as he learned comedic improvisation from his co-stars, Will Farrell, John C Reilly, and Kathryn Hahn.

He played antagonist Ted Hendricks, Walter Mitty's boss, in the 2013 Ben Stiller remake of The Secret Life of Walter Mitty. His other major studio comedies include Hot Tub Time Machine 2 and the Christmas comedy-horror film Krampus, both in 2015.

Scott has appeared in and produced numerous independent films. He starred as Caleb Sinclaire in the 2010 film The Vicious Kind, for which Scott was nominated for an Independent Spirit Award for Best Actor. The film itself received positive reviews, and he won two individual awards at two separate film festivals. He starred in two films by Matt Bissonette, Who Loves the Sun (2006) and Passenger Side, released on DVD on October 26, 2010. He appeared in the films Our Idiot Brother (2011) with Paul Rudd and Leslye Hedland's 2012 Bachelorette. He had lead roles in Friends with Kids (2012) and A.C.O.D. (2013). 

In 2015, he executive produced and starred in the comedy film The Overnight. 

Scott and Paul Rudd teamed up again to act in and produce the indie comedy Fun Mom Dinner (2017).

Television 
Scott's early television roles include Griff Hawkins in Boy Meets World, Josh on Party of Five, as well as David's love interest, Ben Cooper, on Six Feet Under, and as a law intern on Murder One.

His first series regular role was on the controversial and sexually-explicit HBO drama Tell Me You Love Me (2007) as Palek, a husband struggling to conceive with his wife. In the first and second seasons of the HBO baseball comedy series Eastbound & Down, Scott played a cocaine-addicted baseball front office representative.  

From 2009 to 2010, he starred as Henry Pollard in the Starz network show Party Down. For this performance, he earned an Entertainment Weekly Ewwy nomination for Best Actor in a Comedy Series.

In 2010, Scott joined the cast of NBC's acclaimed comedy series Parks and Recreation, in which he played Ben Wyatt, a state auditor who arrives in the fictional town of Pawnee, Indiana to evaluate the town's funds and eventually becomes the love interest of Leslie Knope. He appeared as a guest star in the second season before becoming a main character for the remainder of the series, which ended in 2015.

Scott and his wife created and produced four Adult Swim mockumentary specials, The Greatest Event in Television History, about remaking opening credits sequences of 1980s television shows. 

Scott continued his comedy roles with several episodes of Ken Marino's The Bachelor parody Burning Love and also on David Wain's Wet Hot American Summer: Ten Years Later. From 2016 to 2018, Scott appeared in four episodes of the hit Mike Schur comedy The Good Place as Trevor, a demon.

In 2017 and 2019, Scott took a turn to dramatic roles by appearing in HBO's Big Little Lies as Ed Mackenzie, husband of main character Madeline Mackenzie, played by Reese Witherspoon. 

Scott starred with Craig Robinson in the sitcom Ghosted, which premiered on October 1, 2017, on Fox, lasting just one season. He and his wife also executive produced the show.

In 2020, Scott hosted the one-season ABC game show Don't, executive produced by Ryan Reynolds.

In 2022, Scott began starring in and producing the Apple TV+ show Severance, which is produced and directed by Ben Stiller. His performance was critically acclaimed.

The cult hit Party Down was revived in 2023, with Scott reprising the character of Henry Pollard.

Scott has done numerous guest appearances, such as in the Adult Swim comedy Childrens Hospital and HBO's VEEP.  He has been on CSI: Miami and Law and Order. He was also on the show NTSF:SD:SUV::, in the episode "The Risky Business of Being Alone in Your Home", and has also appeared in the Comedy Central television show Nick Swardson's Pretend Time, as a newscaster in the episode "Relapse into Refreshment". He has appeared in a series of commercials for ESPN's Sunday Night Baseball.

Podcasting 
With Scott Aukerman, Scott is the co-host and co-creator of the Earwolf podcast U Talkin' U2 To Me, launched in February 2014. The series is introduced at the outset of each episode as "the comprehensive and encyclopedic compendium of all things U2," but it generally uses discussion of the band as a jumping off point for improv and absurdist humor. In February 2018 Scott and Aukerman launched another podcast in the same format, this time covering the career and work of the band R.E.M., titled R U Talkin' R.E.M. Re: Me?. A third podcast, R U Talkin' RHCP Re: Me?, debuted in July 2020, in which Scott and Aukerman discuss the Red Hot Chili Peppers; the podcast's format was almost immediately abandoned in favor of discussing Talking Heads and, as of the second episode, was renamed U Talkin' Talking Heads 2 My Talking Head.

Scott has been a guest on podcasts including Comedy Bang! Bang!, How Did This Get Made?, Armchair Expert with Dax Shepard, and Kevin Pollak's Chat Show.

Personal life 
Scott married Naomi Sablan in 2005. They have two children.

Scott is a "die-hard" fan of the band R.E.M., much like his character in Parks and Recreation. In 1992, he appeared as an extra in the music video to their song "Drive".

During an appearance on Jimmy Kimmel Live!, Scott revealed he invited actor Mark Hamill to one of his childhood birthday parties. Guest host Kristen Bell surprised Scott with the guest appearance of Hamill wielding a lightsaber in observance of Star Wars Day.

Filmography

Film

Television

References

External links 

1973 births
20th-century American male actors
21st-century American male actors
American Academy of Dramatic Arts alumni
American male comedians
American male film actors
American male television actors
American people of Italian descent
American podcasters
Television producers from California
Living people
Male actors from Santa Cruz, California
American television directors
Comedians from California
20th-century American comedians
21st-century American comedians